is a 1994 film directed by Kaizo Hayashi. The film is the first in the series featuring the detective Mike Hama (a play on the Mickey Spillane detective Mike Hammer), which included two more films by Hayashi (Stairway to the Distant Past and The Trap), a TV series (Shiritsu tantei Hama Maiku), and a film made from one episode of that TV series (Mike Yokohama: A Forest with No Name).

Reception
At Metacritic, which assigns a normalized rating out of 100 to reviews from mainstream critics, the film has received an average score of 61, based on 8 reviews.

Notes

External links
 

1994 films
1990s Japanese films